Isomira is a genus of comb-clawed beetles belonging to the family Tenebrionidae.

Selected species
 Isomira antennata (Panzer, 1798)
 Isomira hypocrita Mulsant, 1856
 Isomira icteropa (Küster, 1852)
 Isomira marcida (Kiesenwetter, 1863)
 Isomira murina (Linnaeus, 1758)
 Isomira testacea Seidlitz, 1896
 Isomira thoracica (Fabricius, 1792)
 Isomira umbellatarum (Kiesenwetter, 1863)

References

 Biolib
 Fauna Europaea

Alleculinae
Tenebrionidae genera
Beetles of Europe